Richard A. Moser (born December 18, 1956) is an American actor and a former football running back who played for the Pittsburgh Steelers, Miami Dolphins, Kansas City Chiefs, and Tampa Bay Buccaneers of the National Football League (NFL). Moser attended Scarsdale High School and the University of Rhode Island, where he was a two-time 1st Team NCAA Academic All-American, graduating summa cum laude with a B.S. in marketing.  Moser was elected in 1978 to the Beta Gamma Sigma National Business Honor Society, and held the position of secretary.

Football career
Moser played in parts of five NFL seasons between 1978 and 1982 for four different teams, carrying the ball 54 times for 190 yards and one touchdown. He also caught three passes for 20 yards and one score and returned six kickoffs for 108 yards in his professional career. His primary contribution was on special teams. Moser was a member of two Super Bowl winning teams with the Steelers following the 1978 (Super Bowl XIII) and 1979 (Super Bowl XIV) seasons. In Super Bowl XIV, Moser recorded a Super Bowl record of five tackles on the kickoff team.

Acting career
Moser has acted in several movies, most notably as the high-sock-wearing assistant football coach in Dazed and Confused, as a football player in Everybody's All-American, and as himself in Fighting Back: The Rocky Bleier Story. He has appeared in the popular television series The Facts of Life and Diff'rent Strokes, and had recurring roles on ABC's General Hospital and HBO's 1st & Ten. Moser appeared in numerous national TV commercials and had modeled in print advertisements.

References

External links
 
 

1956 births
Living people
American male film actors
American football running backs
Kansas City Chiefs players
Miami Dolphins players
Pittsburgh Steelers players
Rhode Island Rams football players
Tampa Bay Buccaneers players
People from Scarsdale, New York
People from White Plains, New York
Players of American football from New York (state)
Scarsdale High School alumni
Sportspeople from Westchester County, New York